Neoconocephalus melanorhinus, the black-nosed conehead, is a species of conehead in the family Tettigoniidae. It is found in North America.

References

Further reading

 
 

melanorhinus
Insects described in 1907